Edward Addicks Christmas (October 10, 1903 - October 17, 1969) was an American Thoroughbred horse racing trainer. Born in Upper Marlboro, Maryland, he is best known for training U. S. Racing Hall of Fame inductee Challedon in 1942, and Gallorette, the 1946 American Champion Older Female Horse and U. S. Racing Hall of Fame inductee.

Edward Christmas studied at the University of Maryland then attended its University of Maryland School of Law. He graduated in 1929 and for the next seven years worked for the law department at the university.

In the U.S. Triple Crown series, Edward Christmas earned a third-place finish in the 1943 Preakness Stakes. In 1948 he finished sixth with Escadru in the Kentucky Derby, then after skipping the Preakness, ran third in the Belmont Stakes. Escadru, who had won the 1947 Ardsley Handicap, went on to win the 1948 Peter Pan Stakes.

During his career, he trained for prominent owners such as William L. Brann and Howell E. Jackson III.

References

1903 births
1969 deaths
American horse trainers
University of Maryland, College Park alumni
University of Maryland Francis King Carey School of Law alumni
Lawyers from Baltimore
People from Upper Marlboro, Maryland